The R549 is a Regional Route in South Africa that connects Heidelberg in Gauteng with Deneysville in the Free State.

Route
Its northern terminus is the R23 in Heidelberg from which it heads south-west. It crosses the R54 before crossing the Vaal River west of the Vaal Dam into the Free State and reaching an intersection with the R716 in Deneysville, marking its end.

References

Regional Routes in Gauteng
Regional Routes in the Free State (province)